Brendan Hill (born 15 September 1964), also known by the nickname of "Bren Gun",  is an English former professional rugby league footballer who played in the 1980s and 1990s.

Playing career

County Cup Final appearances
Brendan Hill played right- in Bradford Northern's 12-12 draw with Castleford in the 1987 Yorkshire Cup Final during the 1987–88 season at Headingley, Leeds on Saturday 17 October 1987, and played right-, scored a try, and was man of the match (the White Rose Trophy was not presented as it had already been awarded to Paul Harkin in the original final) in the 11-2 victory over Castleford in the 1987 Yorkshire Cup Final replay during the 1987–88 season at Elland Road, Leeds on Saturday 31 October 1987.

Regal Trophy Final appearances
Brendan Hill played left- in Halifax's 12-24 defeat by Wigan in the 1989–90 Regal Trophy Final during the 1989–90 season at Headingley, Leeds on Saturday 13 January 1990.

Club career

Hill was transferred from Bradford Northern to Halifax for a transfer fee of £90,000 during January 1989, (based on increases in average earnings, this would be approximately £244,600 in 2017).

References

1964 births
Living people
Bradford Bulls players
English rugby league players
Halifax R.L.F.C. players
Keighley Cougars players
Leeds Rhinos players
Place of birth missing (living people)
Rugby league props
Yorkshire rugby league team players